The House of Iturbide is a former Imperial House of Mexico. It was founded by the Sovereign Mexican Constituent Congress on 22 June 1822 when the newly independent Mexican congress confirmed Agustín I's title of Constitutional Emperor of Mexico. He was baptized with the names of Saints Cosmas and Damian at the cathedral there. The last name Iturbide was originally from the Basque Country, Spain.

History

Decree 
The Sovereign Mexican Constituent Congress decreed on 22 June 1822 the following:

Art 1 °. The Mexican Monarchy, in addition to being moderate and Constitutional, is also hereditary.
Art 2 °. Consequently, the Nation calls the succession of the Crown for the death of the current Emperor, his firstborn son Don Agustín Jerónimo de Iturbide. The Constitution of the Empire will decide the order of succession of the throne.
Art 3 °. The crown prince will be called "Prince Imperial" and will have the treatment of Imperial Highness.
Art 4 °. The legitimate sons and daughters of H.I.M will be called "Mexican Princes", and will have the treatment of Highness.
Art 5 °. Don José Joaquín de Iturbide y Arreguí, Father of H.I.M, is decorated with the title of "Prince of the Union" and the treatment of Highness, during his life.
Art 6 °. It is also granted the title of "Princess of Iturbide" and the treatment of Highness, during his life, to Doña María Nicolasa de Iturbide y Arámburo, sister of the Emperor.

First Mexican Empire (1822–1823)

After Mexico was declared and recognized as an independent state, Iturbide was backed and influenced by Mexico's conservatives, who favored an independent Mexico with a monarch from one of the European royal families as head of state. When no European royalty accepted Mexico's offer (as Spain still had hopes of taking Mexico back), Iturbide was persuaded by his advisers to be named Emperor in the manner of Napoleon I.

On 11 May 1823, the ex-emperor boarded the British ship Rawlins, en route to Livorno, Italy (then part of the Grand Duchy of Tuscany, accompanied by his wife, children and some servants. There, he rented a small country house and began to write his memoirs. However, Spain pressured Tuscany to expel Iturbide, which it did, and the Iturbide family moved to the United Kingdom. There, he published his autobiography, "Statement of Some of the Principal Events in the Public Life of Agustín de Iturbide". When he was exiled, Iturbide was given a government pension, but Congress also declared him a traitor and "outside of the law", to be killed if he ever returned to Mexico. Whether he was aware of this second part is in dispute.

After his departure, the situation in Mexico continued to worsen. Reports of a probable Spanish attempt to retake Mexico reached Iturbide in the UK. He continued to receive reports from Mexico, as well as advice from supporters, that if he returned, he would be hailed as a liberator and a potential leader against the Spanish invasion. Iturbide sent word to congress in Mexico City on 13 February 1824 offering his services in the event of a Spanish attack. Congress never replied. More conservative political factions in Mexico finally convinced Iturbide to return."

Iturbide returned to Mexico on 14 July 1824, accompanied by his wife, two children, and a chaplain (Joseph A. Lopez). He landed at the port of Soto la Marina on the coast of Nuevo Santander (the modern-day state of Tamaulipas). They were initially greeted enthusiastically, but soon they were arrested and escorted by General Felipe de la Garza, the local military commander, to the nearby village of Padilla. The local legislature held a trial and sentenced Iturbide to death. When a local priest administered last rites, Iturbide supposedly said, "Mexicans! I die with honor, not as a traitor; do not leave this stain on my children and my legacy. I am not a traitor, no." He was executed by firing squad on 19 July 1824.

Second Mexican Empire (1864–1867)

In 1863, the Mexican Conservative Party, with the support of Napoleon III of France, attempted to establish a monarchy under Austrian Archduke Ferdinand Maximilian as Emperor Maximilian I of Mexico. Maximilian adopted two grandsons of the first Mexican emperor, Agustín de Iturbide y Green and Salvador de Iturbide y Marzán.

Agustín de Iturbide and Salvador de Iturbide were granted the ("vitalicio"  meaning non-hereditary) title of Prince de Iturbide and style of Highness by imperial decree and were ranked after the reigning family.

Decree 
The Emperor Maximilian of Habsburg decreed on 16 September 1865 the following:
 Art 1 °. The title of "Princes of Iturbide" is awarded to Don Agustín de Iturbide and Don Salvador de Iturbide, grandsons of the Emperor Agustín de Iturbide, as well as his daughter Doña Josefa de Iturbide.
 Art 2 °. The Princes mentioned in the previous article, will have the treatment of Highness, and will take rank after the reigning family.
 Art 3 °. This title is not hereditary, and in the event that the mentioned princes had legitimate succession, the reigning Emperor or the Regency will reserve the faculty to grant the expressed title, in each case, to that or those of his successors that they deem convenient.
 Art 4 °. By virtue of the arrangements made with the members of the Iturbide family, the Emperor takes the guardianship and curatorship of the aforementioned princes Agustín and Salvador de Iturbide, appointing as co-tutor the Princess Josefa de Iturbide.
 Art 5 °. The coat of arms used by the aforementioned princes, will be the ancient of his family, with mantle and crown of Prince, and having as support the two rampant wolves of the same shield of his family, granting them by special grace the use of the National Shield in the center of the aforementioned blazon, according to the design that is attached.
 Art 6 °. The Princes of Iturbide will have the right to wear the national badge without a flame, and the button with its crown of Prince.

In 1867, Maximilian was deposed and executed on the orders of Benito Juárez.

Genealogy

Genealogy of Agustín I
Children:
 Agustín Jerónimo de Iturbide y Huarte (1807–1866) Titular Emperor of Mexico (1824-1864)
 Jesusa de Iturbide y Fernández de Piérola (1842–1914)
 Pedro José Nicolás de Piérola Iturbide (1862-1886)
 Eva María de Piérola Iturbide (1863-1919)
 Raquel de Piérola Iturbide (1865-1886)
 Adán Jesús Isaías de Piérola Iturbide (1866-1935)
 Luis Benjamín de Piérola Iturbide (1867-1868)
 Benjamín Amadeo de Piérola Iturbide (1868-1945)
 Jesusa María Salomé Victoria de Piérola Iturbide (1870-1896)
 A large issue of their descendants.
 Eventually:
 Jorge Nicolás de Piérola Gabriel (1977)
 Claudio André de Piérola Gili (1987)
 Sabina María de Iturbide y Huarte (1810–1871)
 Juana María Francisca de Iturbide y Huarte (1812–1828)
 Josefa de Iturbide y Huarte (1814–1891)
 Ángel María José de Iturbide y Huarte (1816–1872)
 Agustín de Iturbide y Green (1863–1925) (adopted by Maximilian I of Mexico) Titular Emperor of Mexico (1867-1925)
 María de Jesús Juana de Iturbide y Huarte (1818–1849)
 María de los Dolores de Iturbide y Huarte (1819–1820)
 Salvador María de Iturbide y Huarte (1820–1856)
 Salvador de Iturbide y Marzán (1849–1895) (adopted by Maximilian I of Mexico)
 Maria Josepha Sophia de Iturbide (1872–1949) Titular Empress of Mexico (1925-1949)
 Baroness Maria Anna Tunkl-Iturbide (1909-1962) 
 Baroness Maria Gisella Tunkl-Iturbide (1912-1999) 
 Count Maximilian von Götzen-Iturbide (1944) Titular Emperor of Mexico (1949-)
 Ferdinand von Götzen-Iturbide (1992)
 Emmanuella von Götzen-Iturbide (1998)
 Countess Emmanuella von Götzen-Iturbide (1945)
 Nicholas McAulay (1970)
 Edward McAulay (1973)
 Augustin McAulay (1977)
 Patrick McAulay (1979)
 Phillip McAulay (1981)
 Camilla McAulay (1982)
 Gisella McAulay (1985)
 Maria Gisella de Iturbide (1874-1875)
 Maria Theresa de Iturbide (1876-1915)
 Felipe Andrés María Guadalupe de Iturbide y Huarte (1822–1853)
 Agustín Cosme de Iturbide y Huarte (1825–1873)

Heraldry

References

External links

 
 The Last Prince of the Mexican Empire, a novel based on the true story by C.M. Mayo
 Library of Congress lecture (podcast) by C.M. Mayo about research in the Emperor Iturbide and Iturbide Family archives, July 2009

|-

 
Mexican monarchy
Pretenders to the Mexican throne
Mexican nobility
Mexican noble families
Mexican people of Basque descent
Royal families of the Americas
Royalty and nobility of Austria-Hungary
Austrian people of Spanish descent
Hungarian nobility
Monarchism in Mexico
Mexican Empire